Bellevue University is a private university in Bellevue, Nebraska. It opened in 1966 as Bellevue College and from the outset has focused on providing adult education and educational outreach. As of 2011, 80% of its undergraduates were aged 25 and over. The university has over 10,000 students enrolled in a variety of undergraduate and graduate programs.

History

Opened in 1966 as Bellevue College, its aim was to provide education for working adults in the area. By 1974 it had become the fourth largest private college in Nebraska and had added a gymnasium, student center, and library.  In 1977, Bellevue earned full accreditation from the North Central Association of Colleges and Secondary Schools. In the mid-1980s increasing competition from other colleges in the area, which had also begun catering to working adult students, created financial problems which nearly led to the college's closure. However, under its third president, John Muller, who took over in 1985, the college refocused, survived, and started to expand.

In 1987 the college began offering an accelerated bachelor's degree program and in 1990 began its first master's degree program. In 1994 Bellevue College became Bellevue University.

Presidents 
Mary Hawkins is the current and fourth president of Bellevue University.

Campus 
The university's main campus is in Bellevue, Nebraska. The campus expanded in the late 1990s and early 2000s with the opening of the Lozier Professional Center in west Omaha, the Riley Technology Center on the main campus, and the Lakeside Center. The library, humanities center, athletic center, and the student center were all renovated, and a new  Educational Services building was built to host classrooms, offices, and faculty space.

Academics
Bellevue University has over 10,000 students and numerous undergraduate and graduate programs including accelerated, cohort-based, in-class, and online. The school offers numerous bachelor's and master's degree programs, a Doctorate of Business Administration, and a Ph.D. in Human Capital Management.  

The university is accredited by the Higher Learning Commission. Business degrees at Bellevue University are accredited by the International Assembly for Collegiate Business Education. The university also offers a Masters of Science degree in Clinical Counseling accredited by the Counsel for Accreditation of Counseling and Related Educational Programs (CACREP)

On March 9, 2020, the Department of Veterans Affairs suspended G.I. Bill reimbursement eligibility for Bellevue University and several other schools due to what the V.A. said were "erroneous, deceptive, or misleading enrollment and advertising practices", giving the schools 60 days to take "corrective action". The VA withdrew its threat of sanctions in July 2020.

In 2022, Bellevue University announced a partnership with the Southern Professional Hockey League to provide tuition reimbursement to SPHL players, staff, and family to attend Bellevue.

Athletics 
The Bellevue athletic teams are called the Bruins. The university is a member of the National Association of Intercollegiate Athletics (NAIA), primarily competing in the North Star Athletic Association (NSAA) since the 2015–16 academic year. The Bruins previously competed in the defunct Midlands Collegiate Athletic Conference (MCAC) from 1994–95 to 2014–15 (when the conference dissolved).

Bellevue competes in 14 intercollegiate varsity sports: Men's sports include baseball, basketball, cross country, golf, soccer and track, while women's sports include basketball, cross country, golf, soccer, softball, track and volleyball; and co-ed sports include eSports.

Accomplishments
The Bellevue men's baseball team won the NAIA Baseball World Series in 1995. In 2011, Bellevue University added men's and women's golf teams. In 2016 Bellevue University started its first ever women's basketball program going 16-15 overall and 9–7 in conference play. In 2017, it added men's and women's cross country teams and the co-ed eSports team.

Notable alumni 
 T.J. Bohn, Major League Baseball player
 Shon Hopwood, former jailhouse lawyer and DC circuit law clerk; professor at Georgetown Law Center
 Abbie Cornett, former member of the Nebraska Legislature
 Judd H. Lyons, United States Army Major General, Adjutant General of the Nebraska National Guard and Deputy Director of the Army National Guard
 Beau McCoy, former member of the Nebraska Legislature
 Michael D. Navrkal, Army National Guard Brigadier General
 James R. Young, former president, chief executive office, and chairman for Union Pacific Railway

References

External links
 
 Official athletics website

 
Buildings and structures in Bellevue, Nebraska
Education in Sarpy County, Nebraska
Educational institutions established in 1966
Private universities and colleges in Nebraska
1966 establishments in Nebraska